The Taiwanese ambassador in Belmopan is the official representative of the Government of Taiwan to the Government of Belize. Before 1989 there was a representative of the Government of China to the Government of Belize (see List of ambassadors of China to Belize). Its first holder was Shi Chunlai.

List of representatives

See also 
Belize–Taiwan relations

References 

Belize
China